Anahola (literally "deadly winds" in Hawaiian) is a census-designated place (CDP) in Kauai County, Hawaii, United States. The population was 2,311 at the 2020 census, up from 1,932 at the 2000 census.

History 
During the reign of King Kamehameha I, the island of Kauaʻi was the last of the Hawaiian islands to join Kamehameha's Kingdom of Hawaiʻi. The ruler, Kaumualii, resisted Kamehameha for years, surviving two attempts to invade Kaua'i.

Anahola is the site of an ancient surfing area, Ka-nahā-wale, which literally translates to "easily broken".

Geography

Anahola is located at  (22.145049, -159.312969).

The community is located on Hawaii Route 56 on the northeast coast of the island of Kauai. Anahola is adjacent to Anahola Bay, a bay of the Pacific Ocean.

Demographics

As of the census of 2000, there were 1,932 people, 549 households, and 422 families residing in the CDP. The racial makeup of the CDP was 13.7% White, 0.4% African American, 0.5% Native American, 7.1% Asian, 47.7% Pacific Islander, 1.4% from other races, and 29.2% from two or more races. Hispanic or Latino of any race were 8.1% of the population.

There were 549 households, out of which 36.4% had children under the age of 18 living with them, 53.2% were married couples living together, 17.5% had a female householder with no husband present, and 23.0% were non-families. 14.6% of all households were made up of individuals, and 3.5% had someone living alone who was 65 years of age or older.  The average household size was 3.52 and the average family size was 3.98.

In the CDP the population was spread out, with 31.7% under the age of 18, 9.5% from 18 to 24, 27.8% from 25 to 44, 22.8% from 45 to 64, and 8.2% who were 65 years of age or older.  The median age was 32 years. For every 100 females, there were 101.0 males.  For every 100 females age 18 and over, there were 95.6 males.

The median income for a household in the CDP was $41,771, and the median income for a family was $41,302. Males had a median income of $25,875 versus $27,000 for females. The per capita income for the CDP was $13,829.  About 12.4% of families and 14.2% of the population were below the poverty line, including 21.5% of those under age 18 and 4.9% of those age 65 or over.

In popular culture
Kalalea Mountain overlooking Anahola is featured in the first shot of the 1981 feature film Raiders of the Lost Ark. The opening scene of this first installment in the Indiana Jones film franchise is supposed to take place in the Peruvian jungle where the main character, Indiana Jones, discovers an ancient booby-trapped temple.

Kalalea and the Anahola mountains also serve as a backdrop for a Polynesian resort - supposedly located on Makatea island - in the 1998 feature film Six Days, Seven Nights. Coincidently, this movie also stars Harrison Ford.

References

External links
  Anahola webpage
  Kauai County page

Populated places on Kauai
Census-designated places in Kauai County, Hawaii
Populated coastal places in Hawaii